USS Ommaney Bay (CVE–79) was a  of the United States Navy, which served during World War II. It was named after Ommaney Bay, located at the south end of Baranof Island, Alaska. Launched in late 1943 and commissioned in early 1944, the ship took part in the Mariana and Palau Islands campaign followed by several battles during the Philippines campaign in 1944 and early 1945. She was heavily damaged in a kamikaze attack and subsequently scuttled on 4 January 1945, with the loss of 95 men, including two men on board the destroyer escort  who were killed by flying debris. She earned 2 battle stars whilst in service.

Design and description

Ommaney Bay was a Casablanca-class escort carrier, the most numerous type of aircraft carriers ever built, and designed specifically to be mass-produced using prefabricated sections, in order to replace heavy early war losses. She displaced  standard,  with a full load. Her compact size necessitated the installment of an aircraft catapult at her bow end, and there were two aircraft elevators to facilitate movement of aircraft between the flight and hangar deck: one on the fore, another on the aft.

One /38 caliber dual purpose gun was mounted on the stern, and she was equipped with 16 Bofors 40 mm (1.57 in) anti-aircraft guns in twin mounts, as well as 12 Oerlikon 20 mm cannons, which were used in an anti-aircraft capability. By the end of the war, Casablanca-class carriers had been modified to carry thirty 20 mm cannons, as a response to increasing casualties due to kamikaze attacks. Anti-aircraft guns were mounted around the perimeter of the deck. Casablanca-class escort carriers were designed to carry 27 aircraft, but she sometimes went over or under this number. For example, during the Mariana and Palau Islands campaign and the Battle off Samar, she carried 16 FM-2 fighters and 11 TBM-1C torpedo bombers, for a total of 27 aircraft. During the Battle of Mindoro, she carried 24 FM-2 fighters and 9 TBM-1C torpedo bombers, for a total of 33 aircraft. Whilst she was in transit in support of the Invasion of Lingayen Gulf, and during her eventual sinking, she carried 19 FM-2 fighters, 10 TBM-1C torpedo bombers, a TBM-3 variant torpedo bomber, and a TBM-1CP spotter plane, for a total of 31 aircraft.

Construction
The escort carrier was laid down on 6 October 1943, under a Maritime Commission contract, MC hull 1116, by Kaiser Shipbuilding Company, Vancouver, Washington. She was launched on 29 December 1943; sponsored by Mrs. P. K. Robottom; transferred to the United States Navy and commissioned on 11 February 1944, Commodore Howard L. Young in command.

Service history 
After commissioning and fitting out at Astoria, Oregon, and conducting shakedown in Puget Sound, Ommaney Bay sailed on 19 March 1944 from Oakland, California, bound for Brisbane, Australia, with passengers and a cargo of supplies and aircraft. By 27 April, she had completed her mission and was back in San Diego, where she began a rigorous ten days of carrier qualification landings, drills and tests. Then, after minor alterations and repairs, the ship sailed on 10 June for Pearl Harbor. Until 12 August she trained air groups and squadrons, then she sailed to Tulagi to rehearse for the invasion of the Palau Islands. From 11 September until the beginning of October, Ommaney Bay sat off Peleliu and Angaur and provided air cover for the fleet and close support strikes for the forces ashore. On 18 September 1944, a TBM-1C from Ommaney Bay, low on fuel, was the first aircraft to land onto Peleliu's airfield.

Ommaney Bay sailed to Manus Island to renew her depleted stock of fuel and ammunition, then joined Rear Admiral Felix Stump's "Taffy 2" (TU 77.4.2) for the invasion of Leyte, arriving on 22 October. At the beginning of the Battle off Samar, the escort carriers began launching airstrikes in an effort to cripple as many of the approaching enemy force as possible. On 25 October, at 01:55, Admiral Thomas C. Kinkaid ordered three searches at daybreak. Ommaney Bay was directed at 05:09 to cover the sector between 340° and 30°. Because of delays, it took two hours for a search contingent of five fighters and seven torpedo bombers to be launched. If launched earlier, the patrol could've possibly intercepted Vice-Admiral Takeo Kurita's task force, and provided advance warning for Taffy 3, influencing the subsequent Battle off Samar.
The search contingent, becoming aware of the confrontation, moved to aid Taffy 3. Some sources credit her airgroup's bombing with seriously damaging the heavy cruiser Chokai during this phase of the battle. Cruiser Haguros action report confirms that it was aerial bombing which crippled her squadron-mate.

At around 08:20, five Wildcats and six Avengers from Ommaney Bay attacked the cruiser , part pf the Japanese force which attacked from the direction of Surigao Strait to the south-west of the landing area, inflicting some damage. 40 minutes later, her Avengers joined 17 other torpedo bombers in crippling Mogami. Ommaney Bay launched some six strikes that day, and along with the rest of Task Group 77.4.1, she turned potential defeat into victory. As part of Taffy 2, she was also obliged to accept aircraft from other task groups, which were damaged or low on fuel from their strikes. She was forced to jettison several aircraft over her deck to preserve the functionality of her flight deck. On 30 October, her task group retired from Leyte Gulf, bound for Manus.

The carrier spent the month of November at Manus and Kossol Passage for availability and replenishment. Even from her distant vantage point, Ommaney Bay was showered with metal fragments, and was hit by a tidal wave. From 12 December to 17 December, the escort carrier operated in the Mindanao and Sulu Seas in support of operations on the island of Mindoro.

On the early morning of 15 December, forty Japanese planes, divided equally between kamikazes and escorts, took off from Clark Field and Davao, bound for the battleships and carriers to the east of Mindoro. The first sightings were reported at 7:00, and for the rest of the morning, kamikaze attacks harried the task force. At 09:40, a group of Japanese planes dove towards the carriers. However, a Yokosuka P1Y kamikaze dove directly towards Ommaney Bay, approaching from the port-bow side. On 19 December she returned to Kossol Passage. On 27 December, she departed for the Philippines in support of the planned 6th Army landings at Lingayen Gulf. After arriving, she paused at San Pedro Bay, before leaving port and entering the Sulu Sea on 3 January 1945.

Sinking

On the afternoon of 4 January 1945, she was transiting the Sulu Sea, to the west of the Philippines. These planes split into two groups, one group heading towards the rear of the task group, whilst the other continued on its course towards the center. Although fighters from the carrier group were scrambled, false radar signals hampered their efforts to intercept, and the only successful interception was when P-47 fighters intercepted two enemy planes, shooting down one. The other plane escaped, and is believed to be the kamikaze which would attack Ommaney Bay. This successful intercept was not reported back to command, nor was the fact that the plane which escaped was being herded towards the carrier group. At 17:12, a Yokosuka P1Y penetrated the screen undetected and made for Ommaney Bay, approaching directly towards the ship's bow. Captain Young later reported that the kamikaze's approach was concealed by the blinding glare of the sun.

Captain Young, acutely aware of the kamikaze threat, had assigned multiple lookouts throughout the carrier's deck. At the time of the attack, ten lookouts were assigned, along with an additional lookout located on the signal platform, equipped with Polaroid glasses. Additionally, a lack of radar signals had led the task group to believe that the Japanese planes had withdrawn, and the kamikaze attack took the lookouts by complete surprise.  was only able to respond with inaccurate anti-aircraft fire, whilst Ommaney Bay was unable to react at all. The plane sliced across the superstructure with its wing, collapsing it onto the flight deck. It then veered into her flight deck on the forward starboard side. Two bombs were released; one of them penetrated the flight deck and detonated below, setting off a series of explosions among the fully gassed planes on the forward third of the hangar deck, near the No. 1 boiler uptakes. The second bomb passed through the hangar deck, ruptured the fire main on the second deck, and exploded near the starboard side. A TBM torpedo bomber had been hit by the kamikaze's wreckage, sparking a fire which consumed the aft of the flight deck. Water pressure forward was lost immediately, along with power and bridge communications. An oil tank may have been breached, contributing to the fire, as the smoke was noted as looking "oily".

Men struggling with the terrific blazes on the hangar deck soon had to abandon it because of the heavy black smoke from the burning planes and exploding .50 caliber ammunition. Destroyer escorts found it difficult to assist Ommaney Bay, because of the intense heat, the ammunition going off, and the real possibility that a catastrophic detonation could be triggered by the blaze. The destroyer , attempting to maneuver into a position to fight the fires, collided with the carrier, damaging her port bridge wing. At 17:45, wounded crew began to be taken off the ship, and by 17:50 the entire topside area had become untenable. In addition, the stored torpedo warheads threatened to detonate at any time. The order to abandon ship was given. At 18:12, Captain Young was the last man to evacuate the burning wreck. At 18:18, the torpedoes stored in the aft end of the ship finally detonated, collapsing the flight deck and launching debris onto the destroyers who were rescuing survivors. Two crewmen from the  aboard a motor whaleboat were struck and killed by airborne debris.

At 19:58 the carrier was scuttled by a torpedo from the destroyer , under orders from Admiral Jesse B. Oldendorf. A total of 95 Navy men were lost, and 65 men were wounded, including the two killed from Eichenberger. On 6 January and on 9 January,  was struck by kamikaze attacks, killing seven survivors rescued from Ommaney Bay. As a replacement for the sunken carrier,  was dispatched to support the landing on Lingayen Gulf.

See also 
 List of U.S. Navy losses in World War II

References

Sources

Online sources

Bibliography

External links 

 

 

Casablanca-class escort carriers
World War II escort aircraft carriers of the United States
Ships built in Vancouver, Washington
Shipwrecks in the Sulu Sea
World War II shipwrecks in the Pacific Ocean
1943 ships
Ships sunk by kamikaze attack
Aircraft carriers sunk by aircraft
Maritime incidents in January 1945
Shipwrecks of the Philippines
S4-S2-BB3 ships
Naval magazine explosions